Amanda Hopmans (born 11 February 1976) is a former professional tennis player from the Netherlands.
She turned professional in February 1994, and on 1 November 1999, she achieved her career-high ranking of world No. 72.

Her biggest career result was in 2000, when she reached her only WTA Tour final at the J&S Cup, held in Warsaw. In the final, she lost to Henrieta Nagyová in three sets.

Hopmans retired from tennis in 2003.

WTA career finals

Singles: 1 (runner-up)

Doubles: 1 (runner-up)

ITF Circuit finals

Singles: 11 (8–3)

Doubles: 22 (11–11)

External links
 
 
 
 
 

1976 births
Living people
Dutch female tennis players
Olympic tennis players of the Netherlands
People from Goirle
Sportspeople from North Brabant
Tennis players at the 2000 Summer Olympics
20th-century Dutch women
21st-century Dutch women